Michaelerberg-Pruggern is a municipality in the district of Liezen in Styria, Austria. It was created on 1 January 2015 as part of the Styria municipal structural reform, when the former municipalities of Michaelerberg and Pruggern were merged.

References

Cities and towns in Liezen District